The  is a south-north national expressway, and the longest expressway in Japan at . Its southern terminus is in Kawaguchi, Saitama in the Greater Tokyo Area, at the Tokyo Gaikan Expressway and Kawaguchi Route near Araijuku Station, and its northern terminus is at Aomori Interchange in Aomori, Aomori in the northern part of the Tōhoku region, where it meets the Aomori Expressway and Aomori Belt Highway near the Sannai-Maruyama Site.

The expressway is signed E4 under the "2016 Proposal for Realization of Expressway Numbering", because it roughly parallels National Route 4.

Route description

The expressway links the Tōhoku region with the Kantō region and the greater Tokyo urban area. It is also the longest expressway among all expressways operated by East Nippon Expressway Company.

Starting at a junction with the Tokyo Gaikan Expressway to the north of Tokyo, the expressway follows a northerly course through the plains of Saitama Prefecture and Tochigi Prefecture before entering the mountainous interior of the Tōhoku region. Passing through central Fukushima Prefecture, the expressway then enters Miyagi Prefecture and passes to the west of Sendai, the largest city in the Tōhoku region. The expressway continues north into Iwate Prefecture, passing the prefectural capital Morioka. In the northern part of Iwate, the expressway veers to the northwest, while the Hachinohe Expressway branches off to the northeast. The Tōhoku Expressway continues into central Aomori Prefecture. Before terminating in the city of Aomori, the Aomori Expressway begins, continuing east as an extension of the expressway towards Hachinohe by a series of toll roads and expressways.

The route parallels the Tōhoku Shinkansen and Tōhoku Main Line of East Japan Railway Company as well as National Route 4 from its origin in Tokyo to the city of Morioka. North of Morioka, the route diverges to the northwest and parallels the Ōu Main Line and National Route 7. It follows this path winding through the Ōu Mountains to its northern terminus in Aomori at National Route 7 about a kilometer south of the Tōhoku Shinkansen's northern terminus at Shin-Aomori Station.

The standard rate for travelling the entirety of the Tōhoku Expressway in a normal-sized car from Kawaguchi Junction to Aomori Interchange is 13,800 yen, in a kei car the cost is 11,100 yen.

Naming
Tōhoku refers to the Tōhoku region, the northernmost region on the island of Honshū.

Officially the expressway is designated as the Tōhoku Jūkan Expressway Hirosaki Route. It is also concurrent with the Tōhoku Jūkan Expressway Hachinohe Route until , where it diverges from the Tōhoku Expressway to become the Hachinohe Expressway.

History

Initial construction
The first section of the Tōhoku Expressway opened on 13 November 1972 between Kanuma and Utsunomiya interchanges. The next year saw the opening of three sections of the highway: first, an extension north from Utsunomiya Interchange to Yaita Interchange on 9 August, next another section between Shirakawa and Koriyama interchanges opened on 26 November followed by a section opening the next day between Shiroishi and Sendai-minami interchanges. In 1974, only one section between Yaita and Shirakawa interchanges was opened along the expressway on 20 December, this connected the southern section and central sections. 1975 saw the completion of two more sections of the expressway: one between Koriyama and Shiroishi interchanges on 1 April (linking the extant southern and northern sections), and then another on 28 November between Sendai-minami and Izumi interchanges. In 1976, only one section between Izumi and Furukawa interchanges was opened along the expressway on 9 December, extending the expressway further north. 1977 saw the completion of another two sections of the expressway: one between Furukawa and Tsukidate interchanges on 15 November, and then a separate section on 19 November between Ichinoseki and Morioka-minami interchanges. On 2 December 1978, that separate section was linked to the rest of the expressway. The next year saw the opening of two sections of the highway: first, the northernmost section of what would be the completed expressway between Ōwani-Hirosaki and Aomori interchanges on 27 September, next another section extending the expressway north from Morioka-minami Interchange to Takizawa was opened on 18 October. Also, Shiwa Interchange was inserted into the existing expressway on 13 October. 1980 would see the opening of three more sections of the expressway: the first of these extended the expressway south from Iwatsuki Interchange to Urawa Interchange on 26 March, the second extended the main section of the expressway north from Takizawa Interchange to Nishine Interchangeon 8 October, the third extended the northern section of the expressway south to Ikarigaseki Interchange on 29 October. On 4 August 1981, Motomiya Interchange was added to the extant expressway. In 1982, Wakayanagi-Kannari Interchange was added to the extant expressway on 29 March and a new section of the expressway opened on 29 October, extending the main section of the expressway north to Ashiro Interchange. The main section was extended north again on 20 October 1983 to Kazuno-Hachimantai Interchange. In 1984, it was extended north to Towada Interchange on 27 September. Koriyama-minami Interchange was added on 6 November. Hanamaki-minami Interchange was added to the extant expressway on 24 July 1986. Later, on 30 July the completion of the -long Sakanashi Tunnel allowed for the separate northern section of the expressway to be linked to the rest of the expressway. The expressway was completed on 9 September 1987 when it was extended south to its southern terminus at Kawaguchi Junction.

Additional work after completion
In October 2004, an experiment was conducted to test the viability of smart interchanges was conducted on the Fukushima-Matsukawa Smart Interchange, which was installed onto the pre-existing Fukushima-Matsukawa Parking Area in the city of Fukushima. After the experimental smart interchange was deemed successful, the Fukushima-Matsukawa Smart Interchange as well as sixteen others around the country were officially opened to traffic across the country in October 2006. Many sections of the expressway were damaged on 11 March 2011 during the 2011 Tōhoku earthquake and tsunami. The expressway reopened on 24 March 2011.

List of interchanges and features
PA - parking area, SA - service area, TB - toll gate

References

External links 

 East Nippon Expressway Company

 
Expressways in Japan
Roads in Akita Prefecture
Roads in Aomori Prefecture
Roads in Fukushima Prefecture
Roads in Gunma Prefecture
Roads in Iwate Prefecture
Roads in Miyagi Prefecture
Roads in Saitama Prefecture
Roads in Tochigi Prefecture
1972 establishments in Japan